Bernardo Correia Ribeiro de Carvalho Costa (born 18 March 1988), popularly known as Agir, is a Portuguese singer and composer. He was born in Lisbon.

Nominations and awards

Discography

Studio albums

Singles

References

1988 births
Living people
Portuguese male singer-songwriters
21st-century Portuguese male singers
Portuguese house musicians
Singers from Lisbon